The 2008 New York Giants season was the franchise's 84th season in the National Football League (NFL) as the team looked to defend its Super Bowl XLII title. They improved upon their 10–6 record from 2007, becoming NFC East champions and finished with the #1 seed in the NFC playoffs for the only time in the Tom Coughlin era. Despite a franchise best 11–1 start and clinching the number 1 seed for the first time in eight years, the Giants lost four of their last five games, including their first playoff game against the Eagles, ending their season. The Giants were the only NFC team from the 2007 playoffs to qualify for the 2008 playoffs.

The 2008 season was the first and only time in franchise history the Giants qualified for the playoffs for the fourth consecutive season. This was also the first time that the Giants made the playoffs the year after making the Super Bowl, after missing the playoffs in 1987 (following win in Super Bowl XXI), 1991 (following win in Super Bowl XXV), and 2001 (following loss in Super Bowl XXXV).

The 2008 Giants led the NFL in rushing and set a franchise record with 2,518 rushing yards. Their running attack was headlined by the trio of Brandon Jacobs, Derrick Ward, and Ahmad Bradshaw, respectively nicknamed "Earth, Wind, and Fire." The Giants became the fifth team in NFL history with two players to rush for more than 1,000 yards: Jacobs (1,089) and Ward (1,025). Ward signed with the Tampa Bay Buccaneers after the season while Jacobs and Bradshaw won another Super Bowl with the Giants in 2011.

Offseason

Player and personnel moves

Releases and injuries
On February 29, the first day of free-agency, Giants free agent linebacker Kawika Mitchell left the team to join the Buffalo Bills, safety Gibril Wilson went to the Oakland Raiders, and linebacker Reggie Torbor joined the Miami Dolphins.

On March 14, free agent defensive tackle William Joseph departed to join Wilson with the Raiders.

On April 10, defensive tackle Manuel Wright was released.

On June 9, 15-year veteran, and seven-time Pro-Bowler, Michael Strahan retired and joined the Fox NFL broadcasting team.

On August 26, undrafted rookie free-agent Terrance Stringer was waived.

Draft Class

NOTES: 
The Giants move up one overall position in the first round due to the forfeiture of the New England Patriots first round draft pick.
Giants traded RB Ryan Grant to the Green Bay Packers in exchange for a sixth round pick.
Giants traded their 7th round pick to the Kansas City Chiefs in exchange for Placekicker Lawrence Tynes in the previous season.

Staff

Final roster

2008 season

Preseason schedule

Regular season
The Giants began their title defense in the traditional NFL Kickoff game like previous champions when they played the Washington Redskins at Giants Stadium. Traditionally, this game is usually played on the first Thursday following Labor Day in the United States. This day fell on September 4 in 2008.

On March 26, the NFL, NBC, and the Republican National Committee agreed in principle to move the kickoff time of the opener to 7:00 pm EDT instead of 8:30 pm EDT to accommodate the 2008 Republican National Convention.

Standings

Week 1: vs. Washington Redskins
NFL Kickoff game

With their Super Bowl championship title to defend, the Giants began their season in the annual kickoff game against their NFC East rivals, the Washington Redskins.  In the first quarter, New York got a fast start as Super Bowl XLII MVP QB Eli Manning capped off the game's opening drive with a 1-yard TD run.  Later in the quarter, kicker John Carney managed to get  a 24-yard field goal.  In the second quarter, the G-Men increased their lead with Carney nailing a 25-yard and a 47-yard field goal.  Near the end of the half, the Redskins managed to get on the board as QB Jason Campbell completed a 12-yard TD pass to WR Santana Moss. New York's defense stiffened in the second half and allowed them to hold on for the victory.

With the win, not only did the Giants begin their season at 1–0, they also became the 9th-straight defending Super Bowl champion to win their season opener.

Week 2: at St. Louis Rams

Coming off their divisional home win over the Redskins, the Giants flew to the Edward Jones Dome for a Week 2 duel with the St. Louis Rams.  In the first quarter, the G-Men drew first blood with QB Eli Manning completing a 33-yard TD pass to WR Plaxico Burress.  In the second quarter, the teams traded 2 field goals, and the Giants led 13-7 at halftime.

In the third quarter, New York increased its lead with Manning completing a 10-yard TD pass to WR Amani Toomer.  In the fourth quarter, the Rams tried to rally as QB Marc Bulger completed a 45-yard TD pass to WR Torry Holt.  Afterwards, the Big Blue pulled away with Manning's 18-yard TD pass to RB Ahmad Bradshaw, DE Justin Tuck's 41-yard interception return for a touchdown, and Bradshaw's 31-yard TD run.

With the win, not only did the Giants improve to 2–0, but they also picked up their 12th consecutive road win.

Week 3: vs. Cincinnati Bengals

Coming off their road win over the Rams, the Giants went home for a Week 3 interconference duel with the Cincinnati Bengals.  In the first quarter, the G-Men trailed early as Bengals kicker Shayne Graham kicked a 22-yard field goal.  In the second quarter, New York responded with RB Brandon Jacobs getting a 1-yard TD run.  Cincinnati replied with RB Chris Perry getting a 25-yard TD run, yet the Giants managed to tie the game with kicker John Carney getting a 24-yard field goal.  The Bengals ended the first half with Graham's 30-yard field goal.

In the third quarter, Big Blue responded with Carney's 46-yard field goal.  In the fourth quarter, the Giants took the lead with Carney kicking a 26-yard field goal.  Cincinnati took the lead again with QB Carson Palmer completing a 17-yard TD pass to WR T.J. Houshmandzadeh.  New York reclaimed the lead with QB Eli Manning completing a 4-yard TD pass to TE Kevin Boss on 3rd and Goal, yet the Bengals tied the game with Graham's 21-yard field goal as time expired.  In overtime, after exchanging punts, Manning led the Giants on a 6 play, 66-yard game winning drive, with Carney kicking a 22-yard field goal.

With the win, the Giants entered the bye week at 3–0.

Week 5: vs. Seattle Seahawks

Coming off their bye week, the Giants stayed at home for a Week 5 duel with the Seattle Seahawks.  The game was notable for the fact that WR Plaxico Burress was suspended for this game, due to a minor internal conflict.

In the first quarter, the Giants drew first blood as QB Eli Manning completed a 32-yard TD to WR Domenik Hixon.  The Seahawks responded with kicker Olindo Mare getting a 30-yard field goal.  Afterwards, New York increased its lead with RB Brandon Jacobs getting a 3-yard TD run.  In the second quarter, the Giants continued its run with kicker John Carney getting a 29-yard field goal, Jacobs getting a 1-yard TD run, and Carney kicking a 33-yard field goal.  Seattle closed the half with Mare making a 29-yard field goal.

In the third quarter, the Giants continued their victory march as Manning completed a 23-yard TD pass to WR Sinorice Moss, along with Carney nailing a 35-yard field goal.  In the fourth quarter, New York completed its domination as backup QB David Carr completed a 5-yard TD pass to Moss.

The Giants racked up 523 yards in total offense, their most since collecting 524 yards against Green Bay on January 6, 2002, and limited Seattle to 187.

With their eighth-straight win, the Giants acquired their first 4–0 start since the franchise's Super Bowl XXV championship run of 1990.

The 38-point differential win marked New York's largest regular-season margin of victory since 1972.  The Giants also led the NFL in point differential with +78 in four games.  The second best point differential belonged to the Tennessee Titans, with +59, in five games.

Week 6: at Cleveland Browns

Coming off their dominating home win over the Seahawks, the Giants flew to Cleveland Browns Stadium for a Week 6 interconference duel with the Cleveland Browns on Monday Night Football. Also the first time Tom Coughlin returned to Cleveland since the 2001 Bottlegate incident.

In the first quarter, New York trailed early as Browns kicker Phil Dawson got a 28-yard field goal.  In the second quarter, the Giants took the lead as RB Brandon Jacobs got a 7-yard TD run.  Cleveland regained the lead as RB Jamal Lewis got a 4-yard TD run, along with QB Derek Anderson completing a 22-yard TD pass to TE Darnell Dinkins.  The Giants closed out the half with QB Eli Manning completing a 3-yard TD pass to WR Plaxico Burress.

In the third quarter, the Browns added on to their lead as Dawson nailed a 26-yard field goal.  In the fourth quarter, Cleveland pulled away as Anderson completed an 11-yard TD pass to WR Braylon Edwards and CB Eric Wright returned an interception 94 yards for a touchdown.

With the loss, not only did the Giants fall to 4–1, but their 12-game road winning streak was snapped.

Week 7: vs. San Francisco 49ers

Hoping to rebound from their Monday Night road loss to the Browns, the Giants went home for a Week 7 duel with the San Francisco 49ers.  In the first quarter, New York drew first blood as RB Brandon Jacobs got a 26-yard TD run.  The 49ers responded with kicker Joe Nedney getting a 40-yard field goal.  In the second quarter, the G-Men increased their lead as Jacobs got a 2-yard TD run.  San Francisco answered with QB J.T. O'Sullivan completing a 30-yard TD pass to WR Josh Morgan.  The Giants would close out the half with kicker John Carney getting a 21-yard field goal.

In the third quarter, New York added onto their lead as QB Eli Manning completed a 6-yard TD pass to WR Plaxico Burress.  The 49ers would reply as CB Nate Clements returned a blocked field goal 74 yards for a touchdown.  In the fourth quarter, the G-Men pulled away as Carney nailed a 48-yard field goal, along with DE Justin Tuck forcing an O'Sulivan fumble that would roll towards the 49ers' endzone, causing Morgan to kick the ball out of the back of the endzone, giving New York a safety.

With the win, the Giants improved to 5–1.

Week 8: at Pittsburgh Steelers

Coming off their home win over the 49ers, the Giants flew to Heinz Field for a Week 8 interconference duel with the Pittsburgh Steelers.  In the first quarter, New York trailed early as Steelers RB Mewelde Moore got a 32-yard TD run.  The G-Men would respond with kicker John Carney getting a 26-yard field goal.  In the second quarter, the Giants took the lead as Carney got a 35-yard and a 25-yard field goal.

In the third quarter, Pittsburgh regained the lead with QB Ben Roethlisberger completing a 65-yard TD pass to WR Nate Washington.  In the fourth quarter, New York pulled within two points as Carney nailed a 24-yard field goal.  Afterwards, the Giants tied the game as LB James Harrison (who took over the Steelers' long snapper position after their normal long snapper Greg Warren was injured during the game) accidentally snapped the ball high over punter Mitch Berger and it rolled into the back of the endzone for a safety.  Afterwards, New York finished its rally as QB Eli Manning completed a 2-yard TD pass to TE Kevin Boss.

With the win, the Giants improved to 6–1.

Week 9: vs. Dallas Cowboys

Coming off their huge road win over the Steelers, the Giants went home for a Week 9 NFC East duel against the rival Dallas Cowboys.  In the first quarter, the G-Men drew first blood as QB Eli Manning completed a 13-yard TD pass to TE Kevin Boss and a 5-yard TD pass to WR Steve Smith.  In the second quarter, the Cowboys responded with CB Mike Jenkins returning an interception 23 yards for a touchdown.  New York would end the half with Manning completing an 11-yard TD pass to WR Amani Toomer.

In the third quarter, the Giants increased their lead as RB Brandon Jacobs got a 12-yard TD run.  In the fourth quarter, Dallas tried to rally as QB Brooks Bollinger completed an 8-yard TD pass to WR Terrell Owens.  Afterwards, New York pulled away as RB Derrick Ward got a 17-yard TD run.

With the win, the Giants improved to 7–1.

Week 10: at Philadelphia Eagles

Coming off their home win over the Cowboys, the Giants flew to Lincoln Financial Field for a Week 10 NFC East duel with the Philadelphia Eagles on Sunday Night Football.  In the first quarter, New York trailed early as Eagles WR DeSean Jackson got a 9-yard TD run.  The Giants responded with QB Eli Manning completing a 17-yard TD pass to WR Plaxico Burress, along with kicker John Carney getting a 27-yard field goal.  In the second quarter, the Giants increased their lead as Manning completed a 1-yard TD pass to TE Kevin Boss.  Philadelphia responded with QB Donovan McNabb completing a 10-yard TD pass to WR Jason Avant.  New York answered right back as Carney got a 26-yard field goal.  The Eagles would close out the half as kicker David Akers got a 29-yard field goal.

In the third quarter, Philadelphia took the lead as McNabb completed a 7-yard TD pass to WR Hank Baskett.  The Giants replied with RB Brandon Jacobs getting a 3-yard TD run.  New York increased their lead as Carney nailed a 28-yard field goal, along with Jacobs getting another 3-yard TD run (with a failed 2-point conversion).  The Eagles tried to come back as McNabb completed a 2-yard TD pass to WR Kevin Curtis. Big Blue's defense managed to prevent any possible comeback, preserving the lead.

With the win, the Giants improved to 8–1.

Week 11: vs. Baltimore Ravens

Coming off their divisional road win over the Eagles, the Giants went home for a Week 11 interconference duel with the Baltimore Ravens.  In the first quarter, the G-Men drew first blood as RB Brandon Jacobs got two 1-yard TD runs (with a failed PAT on the latter).  In the second quarter, New York increased their lead as QB Eli Manning completed a 1-yard TD pass to TE Darcy Johnson.  The Ravens would respond with kicker Matt Stover getting a 38-yard field goal.

In the third quarter, Baltimore tried to rally as QB Joe Flacco completed a 10-yard TD pass to FB Le'Ron McClain.  The Giants would answer with CB Aaron Ross returning an interception 50 yards for a touchdown.  In the fourth quarter, New York pulled away as kicker Lawrence Tynes nailed a 19-yard field goal.

With the win, the Giants improved to 9–1.

Week 12: at Arizona Cardinals

Coming off their home win over the Ravens, the Giants flew to the University of Phoenix Stadium for a Week 12 duel with the Arizona Cardinals.  In the first quarter, New York trailed early as Cardinals kicker Neil Rackers got a 34-yard field goal.  In the second quarter, the Giants responded with RB Derrick Ward getting a 1-yard TD run.  Arizona would answer with RB Tim Hightower getting a 4-yard TD run (with a failed extra-point attempt).  New York replied with kicker John Carney getting a 33-yard field goal, yet the Cardinals got the lead again as Rackers made a 20-yard field goal.  The Giants would regain the lead prior to halftime as QB Eli Manning completed a 12-yard TD pass to WR Amani Toomer.

In the third quarter, the G-Men increased their lead as Manning completed a 2-yard TD pass to FB Madison Hedgecock.  Arizona would answer with Hightower's 1-yard TD run.  In the fourth quarter, New York greatly increased their lead as Manning completed a 10-yard TD pass to TE Kevin Boss. Following an interception by Terrell Thomas, John Carney got a 27-yard field goal.  Arizona would respond with QB Kurt Warner completing a 5-yard TD pass to WR Anquan Boldin, yet the Giants answered with Carney getting a 33-yard field goal.  The Cardinals tried to come back as Rackers nailed a 44-yard field goal.  Fortunately, New York recovered the following onside kick and prevailed.

With the win, the Giants improved to 10–1.

Plaxico Burress shooting
On Friday, November 28, 2008, Giants wide receiver Plaxico Burress suffered an accidental self-inflicted gunshot wound to the right thigh in a New York City nightclub when his gun, tucked in the waistband of his sweatpants, began sliding down his leg. The injury was not life-threatening and he was released from an area hospital the next afternoon. The following Monday, Burress turned himself in to police to face charges of criminal possession of a handgun. Burress had an expired concealed carry (CCW) license from Florida, but no New York license.

On December 2, 2008, Burress posted bail of $100,000.  He was scheduled to return to court on March 31, 2009, to enter a plea.  Later in the day, Burress reported to Giants Stadium as per team policy for injured but active players, and was told he would be suspended without pay. 

Burress would later be released by the Giants on April 3, 2009.

Week 13: vs. Washington Redskins

Coming off their road win over the Cardinals, the Giants flew to Fedex Field for a Week 13 NFC East rematch with the Washington Redskins.  In the first quarter, New York scored first as QB Eli Manning completed a 40-yard TD pass to WR Amani Toomer, along with kicker John Carney getting a 31-yard field goal.  In the second quarter, the Giants increased their lead as Carney got a 38-yard field goal.  The Redskins would close out the half with WR Devin Thomas getting a 29-yard TD run.

In the third quarter, New York began to pull away as RB Brandon Jacobs got a 1-yard TD run.  In the fourth quarter, the Giants sealed the deal with Carney connecting on a 39-yard field goal.

With the season-sweep, the Giants improved to 11–1, exceeding the 1986 and 1990 teams (both started 10–2 and eventually won the Super Bowl) for the best 12-game record in franchise history.

Week 14: vs. Philadelphia Eagles

Philadelphia would score first in the game with a 51-yard David Akers field goal. Then in the second quarter, the Eagles Brian Westbrook scored on a 30-yard touchdown run that gave Philadelphia a 10–0 lead. With 7 seconds left in the 1st half, the Eagles attempted to go up 13–0 with a field goal, instead, the kick was blocked and returned 71 yards by Kevin Dockery for a Giants touchdown. That cut the lead to 10–7.

Early in the third quarter, Donovan McNabb found Brian Westbrook for a 40-yard Eagles touchdown that increased their lead to 17–7. Philadelphia would score again in the 3rd with a 34-yard field goal by David Akers. The Giants would score on a 1-yard pass from Eli Manning to Darcy Johnson with 20 seconds left in the game, but couldn't recover an onside kick and the Eagles won the game.

Despite falling to 11–2, the Giants clinched the NFC East title when the Dallas Cowboys lost to the Pittsburgh Steelers 20–13.

Week 15: at Dallas Cowboys

The second-to-last NFL game ever to be played at Texas Stadium was a defensive struggle that featured the Giants' weakest offensive showing of the year. Brandon Jacobs was sidelined with a knee injury, crippling New York's running game; Derrick Ward started in his place.

The Cowboys scored first, on a 34-yard touchdown pass from Tony Romo to Patrick Crayton early in the second quarter. The Giants answered with a 34-yard John Carney field goal on the ensuing drive. The next scoring came in the fourth quarter, when Romo threw fullback Deon Anderson his first career touchdown. On the Cowboys' next drive, deep in their own territory, Mathias Kiwanuka sacked Romo and forced a fumble in the end zone, which resulted in a safety. But the Giants could only put up another field goal, and Tashard Choice's 38-yard touchdown run with 2:24 to play sealed the victory for the Cowboys. Eli Manning was sacked a season-high eight times to Romo's four.

The Giants had now lost two consecutive games for the first time since Weeks 1–2 of 2007, and fell to 11–3.

Week 16: vs. Carolina Panthers

The Giants snapped their two-game losing streak and clinched home field advantage throughout the NFC playoffs by defeating the Panthers. With the loss Carolina failed to clinch the NFC South. The Giants had already clinched a first round bye by virtue of Minnesota's loss to Atlanta earlier in the day.

New York won the toss and scored on their opening drive on a 32-yard John Carney field goal. Carolina responded by scoring a touchdown on their first drive, a thirteen-yard run by DeAngelo Williams.

The Giants scored on their second drive as well, going 74 yards in 13 plays and ending with a Brandon Jacobs touchdown from the Carolina 2. The Panthers responded with another Williams touchdown run, this time five yards, and a 14–10 lead. After forcing the Giants to punt Carolina scored again, as Williams scored his third touchdown of the game on a one-yard run. The drive went four plays for 65 yards, 60 of which came on a deep pass from Jake Delhomme to Muhsin Muhammad. Williams' touchdown came two plays after Steve Smith appeared to have scored on a short pass, but a replay challenge was upheld.

After the teams traded punts the Giants scored with 0:55 remaining in the half as Carney added his second field goal of the game. Then on their second drive of the second half, Eli Manning threw a short touchdown to Kevin Boss to cut the deficit to 21–20 with 1:07 remaining in the third quarter. Carolina scored on their very next drive, with Williams scoring for the fourth time on a thirty-yard run.

New York tied the game with 3:24 remaining as Jacobs scored on a one-yard touchdown run, after starting the drive in Panther territory. The Giants converted the two-point conversion on a pass from Manning to Domenik Hixon. Carolina then drove down the field and faced fourth and five from the Giants 32-yard line, but John Kasay missed the potential game-winning field goal from 50 yards out.

On their second possession of the overtime period the Giants started at their own 13-yard line. On the first play of the drive Derrick Ward ran for 51 yards and pushed the ball into Carolina territory. Ward added a fourteen-yard run two plays later and a seventeen-yard run the play following that, pushing his rushing total to 215 yards (a career-high) and leaving the Giants two yards from the endzone. On the next play Jacobs scored on a run, his third score of the game, and New York won the game.

The Giants rushed for 301 yards in the game compared to 158 for the Panthers. Jacobs added 87 yards to Ward's 215. Williams rushed for 108 yards on 24 carries, including his four touchdowns. Delhomme finished 11–19 for 185 yards and Manning 17–27 for 181 and a touchdown.

Ward's 14.3-yard rushing average was a single game Giants record. Manning became the first Giants quarterback to throw at least 3,000 passing yards in a season for four consecutive seasons.

While the gametime temperature was 34°, the wind chill being -28 made the game feel like it was only 6° at kickoff. Both teams emphasized their running games, 7 of the 8 touchdowns scored were on the ground.

Week 17: at Minnesota Vikings

The Giants lost their final game of the 2008 regular season in Minneapolis, their first loss to the Vikings in the Metrodome since the 2001 season. Minnesota clinched the NFC North division crown with the win. New York rested most of their starters in the second half and Brandon Jacobs, Kevin Boss, Aaron Ross, and Barry Cofield were held out of the game due to injuries.

After a scoreless first quarter the Vikings jumped out to a 10–0 lead early in the second quarter, with a Ryan Longwell field goal and a 67-yard touchdown run by Adrian Peterson coming 3:27 apart. Three field goals by John Carney cut the Vikings' lead to 10–9 at the half.

The Giants took their first lead in the third quarter as David Carr hit Domenik Hixon for a 23-yard touchdown pass and extended the lead to nine with 11:25 remaining in the game as Carney added his fourth field goal. Minnesota scored a touchdown on a long pass from Tarvaris Jackson to Bernard Berrian on their next drive, cutting the Giants lead to 19–17. The Giants then had a chance to extend the lead and force Minnesota to score a touchdown to win, but Carney missed from 48 yards with 3:17 to go. Jackson then led the Vikings into field goal range and Longwell hit from 50 yards out to win the game as time expired.

Eli Manning, who started for the Giants but was pulled in the third quarter, led the team with 119 yards passing on 11-for-19, and Carr added 110 yards on 8-for-11. Halfback Derrick Ward rushed for 77 yards on 15 carries, eclipsing 1,000 yards for the season (1,025), joining Jacobs in the 1,000-yard club and making the Giants the fourth team in NFL history (joining the 1971 Dolphins, 1976 Steelers, and 1985 Browns) with two 1,000-yard running backs.

Transactions

September
1 – Signed defensive end Jerome McDougle
1 – Signed defensive tackle Jeremy Clark to practice squad
1 – Signed defensive end Wallace Gilberry to practice squad
1 – Signed offensive tackle Na'Shan Goddard to practice squad
1 – Signed wide receiver Marcus Monk to practice squad
1 – Signed cornerback Geoffrey Pope to practice squad
1 – Signed offensive guard Kurt Quarterman to practice squad
1 – Signed quarterback Andre Woodson to practice squad
1 – Signed corerback Rashad Barksdale (Chiefs) to practice squad
1 – Placed defensive tackle Rodney Leisle on waivers
2 – Placed defensive tackle Rodney Leisle on reserve/injured
2 – Signed tight end Eric Butler to practice squad
2 – Released cornerback Geoffrey Pope from practice squad
8 – Signed wide receiver Taye Biddle (Detroit) to practice squad
8 – Released wide receiver Marcus Monk from practice squad
11 – Signed defensive tackle Leger Douzable (Vikings) to practice squad
11 – Released offensive guard Kurt Quarterman from practice squad
23 – Released tight end Eric Butler from practice squad
24 – Suspended wide receiver Plaxico Burress for 2 weeks
24 – Activated wide receiver Taye Biddle from practice squad
24 – Signed wide receiver John Broussard to practice squad

October
7 – Placed wide receiver Taye Biddle on waivers
7 – Released John Broussard from practice squad
9 – Signed wide receiver Taye Biddle to practice squad
21 – Signed offensive tackle Cliff Louis to practice squad
21 – Released cornerback Rashad Barksdale from practice squad
23 – Signed cornerback Rashad Barksdale to practice squad
23 – Released quarterback Andre Woodson from practice squad
27 – Signed quarterback Andre Woodson to practice squad
27 – Released offensive tackle Cliff Louis from practice squad

November
5 – Signed offensive tackle Cliff Louis to practice squad
5 – Released defensive end Wallace Gilberry from practice squad
29 – Placed safety Sammy Knight on injured reserve
29 – Activated defensive tackle Jeremy Clark from practice squad

December
2 – Signed safety Travonti Johnson to practice squad
3 – Suspended wide receiver Plaxico Burress for rest of season
3 – Activated defensive tackle Leger Douzable from practice squad
3 – Offensive tackle Na'Shan Goddard claimed by Seattle Seahawks
3 – Signed offensive guard Mike Fladell to practice squad
3 – Signed wide receiver Micah Rucker (Chiefs) to practice squad
16 – Placed running back Reuben Droughns on injured reserve
16 – Signed wide receiver Derek Hagan (Dolphins)
17 – Placed linebacker Jonathan Goff on injured reserve
17 – Signed linebacker Edmond Miles (Dolphins)
29 – Wide receiver Plaxico Burress's suspension lifted, placed on reserve/injured
30 – Placed cornerback Sam Madison on injured reserve
30 – Activated cornerback Rashad Barksdale from practice squad
30 – Signed linebacker Rich Scanlon
30 – Placed linebacker Edmond Miles on waivers
31 – Signed wide receiver Paul Raymond (Lions) to practice squad

Playoffs

NFC Divisional Round: vs. Philadelphia Eagles

Entering the postseason as the NFC's top seed, the Giants began their postseason run at home in the NFC Divisional round against their NFC East rival, the #6 Philadelphia Eagles, in Round 3 of 2008's series.

New York got the early first quarter lead as kicker John Carney got a 22-yard field goal.  The Eagles would respond with quarterback Donovan McNabb getting a 1-yard touchdown run.  The Giants would answer in the second quarter as the defense forced McNabb into an intentional grounding penalty from his own endzone, giving them a safety.  Afterwards, Carney would give New York the lead with a 34-yard field goal.  However, Philadelphia would get the halftime lead as kicker David Akers got a 25-yard field goal.

The Giants would regain the lead in the third quarter as Carney made a 36-yard field goal, but the Eagles got the lead again as Akers kicked a 35-yard field goal.  In the fourth quarter, Philadelphia took control as McNabb completed a 1-yard touchdown pass to tight end Brent Celek, followed by Akers nailing a 20-yard field goal.  New York tried to rally, but the Eagles' defense would shut down any last attempt at a comeback.

With the loss, the Giants' season ended with an overall record of 12–5. This would be the final playoff game at Giants Stadium, as the Giants would move to New Meadowlands Stadium in 2010 after missing the playoffs in 2009. The Philadelphia Eagles became the first, and ultimately only, team to beat the Giants twice in the same season in Giants Stadium – the Giants were 7–2 at home this season and both losses were to the Eagles. It was also the first game in NFL history with a final score of 23–11.

Statistics

Passing

Rushing

Receiving

Defensive

Kicking

Punting

See also
List of New York Giants seasons

References

New York Giants
New York Giants seasons
NFC East championship seasons
New York Giants season
21st century in East Rutherford, New Jersey
Meadowlands Sports Complex